Patrick Damiaens (born 15 November 1966) is a Belgian woodcarver who specialises in baroque ornamental and heraldic sculptures.

Biography 
After studying furniture making for six years and ornamental woodcarving for four years, Damiaens started his professional career in 1989. He is a follower of the Liège-Aachen Baroque furniture style [fr; nl; de] which dates to the 17th century. His studio is located in Maaseik in the Belgian province of Limburg.

In 2015, he was commissioned to recreate intricate woodcarvings for prayer frames that had been stolen from Emperor Napoleon III's tomb in St Michael's Abbey in Farnborough.

In March 2015, he received the Belgian Gold Honour Badge of Labour by Royal Decree.

Case against Zara Home 
In 2017, a judge ruled that Zara Home Belgium which is part of the Spanish multinational Inditex had used one of Patrick Damiaens's heraldic wood carvings designs as inspiration for a candle they sold. They were ordered to pay damages to Damiaens for plagiarism and the candles were taken off the market.

Recovery of stolen coat of arms 
In 2016, Damiaens discovered and helped to return the stolen carving of Sir Nicholas Throckmorton's coat of arms that was taken from his tomb in St Katharine Cree by alerting Art Recovery International of his find in a Namur antique fair.

Distinctions and awards 

 2015: Gold Honour Badge of Labour

See also 

 List of woodcarvers
 Grinling Gibbons
 Peter Van Dievoet
 Jacques Verberckt [fr]
 Jean Démontreuil  
Aubert-Henri-Joseph Parent [fr; de]

Notes and references

Further reading 

 Dirk De Moor and Philippe Debeerst, Manufactum, Editions Snoeck, 2014, pp. 6-13 .

External links 

Website

Heraldic artists
Belgian woodcarvers
20th-century Belgian sculptors
21st-century Belgian sculptors
1966 births
Living people